Beside Still Waters is a phrase used in the 23rd psalm of the Book of Psalms. It could also refer to: 

Beside Still Waters (book), a 1998 book by Greg Easterbrook
Beside Still Waters (film), a 2014 film directed by Chris Lowell